Nicholas Clapp is a Borrego Springs, California based writer, film-maker, and amateur archaeologist who has been called "a modern day  Indiana Jones". He has received 70 film awards (including Emmys), and several films that he edited have received Academy Award nominations. He is a graduate of both Brown University and the University of Southern California, and he has worked for Disney, National Geographic Society, Columbia Pictures, PBS and the White House.

Nicholas Clapp is married to Bonnie Loizos, now Bonnie Clapp. He has two daughters, Jennifer and Cristina.

Books

Films
 Let My People Go: The Story of Israel (1965)
 The Undersea World of Jacques Cousteau (2 episodes, 1968)
 The Rise and Fall of the Third Reich (1968 TV Movie)
 Journey to the Outer Limits (1973)
 National Geographic Specials: The Haunted West (1973), The Great Mojave Desert (1975)
 The Incredible Machine (1975)

References

External links
 
 
 

Living people
Brown University alumni
University of Southern California alumni
American male non-fiction writers
American filmmakers
People from Borrego Springs, California
1936 births